Midnight Moonlight is the thirteenth studio album by the New Riders of the Purple Sage, released in 1992 on the Relix Records label.

Midnight Moonlight features studio recordings of original and cover songs, performed in a style heavily influenced by bluegrass and American folk music.  The instrumentation is largely acoustic, with no drums.  This is in contrast to most earlier New Riders albums, which emphasized electric country rock.

Track listing

"Midnight Moonlight" (Peter Rowan) – (4:10)
"Sutter's Mill" (John Dawson) – (3:25)
"Charlie's Garden" (Dawson) – (3:23)
"All I Remember" (Eric Moll, Karren Pell) – (3:23)
"Louisiana Lady" (Dawson) – (4:30)
"Ballad of the Deportees" (Woody Guthrie) – (3:23)
"Taking It Hard" (Joe New) – (4:26)
"Glendale Train" (Dawson) – (5:09)
"Change in the Weather" (Dawson) – (4:09)
"Diesel on My Tail" (Jim Fagan) – (3:05)
"Lonesome L.A. Cowboy" (Rowan) – (8:37)

Personnel

New Riders of the Purple Sage
John Dawson – acoustic guitar, vocals
Rusty Gauthier – acoustic guitar, slide guitar, mandolin, fiddle, banjo, dumbek, vocals 
Gary Vogensen – electric guitar, vocals
Fred Campbell – bass, acoustic guitar

Additional musicians
Keith Allen – acoustic guitar, slide guitar, vocals
Norton Buffalo – harmonica, tambourine
Carolyn Gauthier – vocals
Bill Laymon – acoustic bass guitar
Evan Morgan – acoustic guitar
David Nelson – mandolin, acoustic guitar
John Pedersen – banjo, uilleann pipes
Kevin Wimmer – fiddle, Cajun accordion

Production
Rusty Gauthier, John Dawson – producers
Rusty Gauthier – recording and mixing

Notes

New Riders of the Purple Sage albums
1992 albums
Relix Records albums